Actenicerus is a genus of click beetle belonging to the family Elateridae, subfamily Dendrometrinae.

There are about 37 species, mostly distributed across the Northern Hemisphere. Of these, 26 are endemic to Japan.

Species
 Actenicerus aerosus (Lewis, 1879)
 Actenicerus alternatus (Heyden, 1886)
 Actenicerus ashiaka Kishii, 1985
 Actenicerus athoides (Kishii, 1955)
 Actenicerus chokai (Kishii, 1966)
 Actenicerus defloratus (Schwarz, 1902)
 Actenicerus formosensis (Miwa, 1928)
 Actenicerus fruhstorferi (Schwarz, 1902)
 Actenicerus giganteus Kishii, 1975
 Actenicerus infirmus (Reitter, 1892)
 Actenicerus jeanvoinei Fleutiaux, 1936
 Actenicerus kiashianus (Miwa, 1928)
 Actenicerus kidonoi Ôhira, 2006
 Actenicerus kunimi (Kishii, 1966)
 Actenicerus kurilensis Dolin, 1987
 Actenicerus maculipennis (Schwarz, 1902)
 Actenicerus miyanourana (Kishii, 1968)
 Actenicerus montanus Kishii, 1998
 Actenicerus mushanus (Miwa, 1928)
 Actenicerus nagaoi Ôhira, 1967
 Actenicerus naomii Kishii, 1996
 Actenicerus nempta Kishii, 1996
 Actenicerus octomaculatus Kishii, 1978
 Actenicerus odaisanus (Miwa, 1928)
 Actenicerus ohbayashii Ôhira, 1964
 Actenicerus orientalis (Candèze, 1889)
 Actenicerus paulinoi (Desbrochers des Loges, 1873)
 Actenicerus pruinosus Motschulsky, 1861
 Actenicerus siaelandicus (O. F. Müller, 1764)
 Actenicerus suzukii (Miwa, 1928)
 Actenicerus taishu Kishii, 1996
 Actenicerus takeshii Arimoto, 1992
 Actenicerus tesselatus (Fabricius, 1775)
 Actenicerus toyoshimai Arimoto & Watanabe, 1993
 Actenicerus tsugaru Kishii, 1978
 Actenicerus yaku Nakane & Kishii, 1958
 Actenicerus yamashiro Kishii, 1998

References

External links
 SYNOPSIS OF THE DESCRIBED COLEOPTERA OF THE WORLD

Further reading
 Mendel, H & Clarke, R. E., 1996, Provisional Atlas of the click beetles of (Coleoptera: Elateroidea) of Britain and Ireland, Ipswich Borough Council Museums, Ipswich
 Speight, M. C. D., 1989, The Irish Elaterid and Buprestid fauna (Coleoptera: Elateridae and Buprestidae), Bulletin of the Irish Biogeographical Society, 12: 31-62

Elateridae genera